Binibining Pilipinas 2005 was the 42nd edition of Binibining Pilipinas. It took place  at the Smart Araneta Coliseum in Quezon City, Metro Manila, Philippines on March 19, 2005.

At the end of the event, Maricar Balagtas crowned Gionna Cabrera as Binibining Pilipinas-Universe 2004. Maria Karla Bautista crowned Carlene Aguilar as Bb. Pilipinas-World 2005, while Margaret-Ann Bayot crowned Precious Lara Quigaman as Binibining Pilipinas-International 2005. Wendy Valdez was named First Runner-Up and was crowned by Michelle Reyes as Binibining Pilipinas Tourism 2005, while Melanie Ediza was named Second Runner-Up.

Results

Color keys
  The contestant Won in an International pageant.
  The contestant was a Semi-Finalist in an International pageant.
  The contestant did not place but won a Special Award in the pageant.

Special Awards

Contestants 
23 contestants competed for the four titles.

Notes

Post-pageant Notes
 Gionna Cabrera competed at Miss Universe 2005 in Bangkok but was unplaced. However, Cabrera won the Miss Photogenic award and was one of the Top 5 for the Best National Costume award.
 Carlene Aguilar competed at Miss World 2005 in Sanya, China and placed in the Top 15. She competed again internationally at the Miss Internet World WWW 2006 pageant and won.
 Precious Lara Quigaman competed at Miss International 2005 in Tokyo and won.

References

2005
2005 in the Philippines
2005 beauty pageants